Bhubaneswar Rajdhani Express is a Rajdhani Express train starting from Bhubaneswar, the capital and largest city of the Indian state of Odisha to the final destination of New Delhi, which serves as the capital of India. Currently, there are three dedicated sets of rakes operating from Bhubaneswar to New Delhi. This is 2nd Rajdhani Train which is having 3 dedicated routes after Dibrugarh Rajdhani Express.

History
 1st set of Bhubaneswar Rajdhani Express was introduced on 1994–95 Rail Budget by C. K. Jaffer Sharief (Former Minister of Railways) as a weekly frequency train. Later the service was increased to bi-weekly after public demand in 1998. It used to get WAP-4 locomotive from Ghaziabad shed (NDLS–HWH) & Santragachi shed (HWH–BBS)  and also changed its route to Adra Instead of bypassing Howrah in 2002.
 2nd set of Bhubaneswar Rajdhani Express was introduced on 2003 by Nitish Kumar (Former Minister of Railways) as a bi-weekly frequency train. Later in 2004 the frequency of this train are increased to 4 days in a week.
 Later, 3rd set of Bhubansewar Rajdhani Express was inaugurated on 10 February 2018, was flagged off by Piyush Goyal (Minister of Railways) as a weekly frequency train which bypasses through Sambalpur.

Routes
The three sets of Bhubaneswar Rajdhani Express runs on three different routes:
 1st set of train number 22811/12 runs through Adra with total distance of 1730 km in length with average speed of 75 km/hr.
Bhubaneswar, Cuttack, Jajpur Keonjhar, Bhadrak, Balasore, Hijli, Bankura, Adra, Gaya, Pt Deen Dayal Upadhyaya Jn, Kanpur, New Delhi.
 2nd set of train number 22823/24 runs through Tatanagar with total distance of 1802 km in length with average speed of 73 km/hr.
Bhubaneswar, Cuttack, Bhadrak, Balasore, Kharagpur, Tatanagar, Bokaro Steel City, Gaya, Pt Deen Dayal Upadhyaya Jn, Kanpur, New Delhi.
 3rd set of train number 20817/18 runs through Sambalpur with total distance of 1910 km in length with average speed of 71 km/hr.
Bhubaneswar, Cuttack, Dhenkanal, Angul, Sambalpur, Jharsuguda, Rourkela, Chakradharpur, Anara, Gaya, Pt Deen Dayal Upadhyaya Jn, Kanpur, New Delhi.
On December 2020, Stoppage at Prayagraj was given to Bhubaneswar Rajdhani

Overview
This train is fully air conditioned and has an AC Hot Buffet car to provide both vegetarian and non-vegetarian meals during the journey. The meals are pre-paid along with the ticket, similar to the other Rajdhani Express trains. The train offers three classes of accommodation i.e. AC First Class (1A) with 2-berth and 4-berth couples (with locking facility for privacy), AC Two Tier (2A) with open bays (4 berths/bay + 2 berths on the other side of the aisle of each bay), provided with curtains for privacy, and AC Three Tier (3A) with open bays (6 berths/bay + 2 berths on the other side of the aisle of each bay) without curtains.

Bhubaneswar Rajdhani's Coaches was painted in Pattachitra and NALCO branding in December 2019.

Traction
The three sets of Bhubaneswar Rajdhani Express are hauled by Electric Loco Shed, Ghaziabad-based WAP-7 on its entire journey.

Coach composition

The trains use modern LHB coach (deployed in 2009) consisting of 1 AC First Class coach (1A), 2 AC Two Tier coaches (2A), 11 AC Three Tier coaches (3A), 1 AC Hot Buffet car (Pantry car) and 2 Luggage/Parcel cum Generator cum Brake Vans, one of which is provided with the Guards' Cabin.

Rake composition

Incidents
 On 27 October 2009, Bhubaneswar Rajdhani was hijacked by Maoists and later train was taken over by Security Forces no damage to life happened.
On 3 Apr 2019, two coaches of Bhubaneswar Rajdhani uncoupled on the river bridge which is 2.5 km away from Cuttack immediately the loco pilot stopped the train, no casualties reported.
 On 11 May 2019, a fire broke out at Generator Car of Bhubaneswar Rajdhani nearby Balasore, immediately railway staffs kept fire in under control, no casualties reported.

Gallery

References

External links 

Rajdhani Express trains
Transport in Bhubaneswar
Rail transport in Odisha
Transport in Delhi
Rail transport in West Bengal
Rail transport in Jharkhand
Rail transport in Bihar
Rail transport in Delhi
Rail transport in Uttar Pradesh